Hayneville (also called Haynesville) is an unincorporated community in Houston County, in the U.S. state of Georgia.

History
A post office called Haynesville was established in 1835, and remained in operation until 1904. The community was named for a pioneer settler with the name Haynes.

References

Unincorporated communities in Houston County, Georgia
Unincorporated communities in Georgia (U.S. state)